The 2013 Calgary Stampeders season was the 56th season for the team in the Canadian Football League and their 79th overall. The Stampeders attempted to win their 7th Grey Cup championship, but fell in the West Final to the eventual champion Saskatchewan Roughriders.

Offseason

CFL Draft
The 2013 CFL Draft took place on May 6, 2013. The Stampeders had seven selections in the seven-round draft, with an additional pick in the second round.

Preseason

Regular season

Season standings

Season schedule

Team

Roster

Coaching staff

Post season

Schedule

Game summaries

West Final: vs Saskatchewan Roughriders

References

Calgary Stampeders seasons
Calg
2013 in Alberta